Inka Wasi (Quechua inka Inca, wasi house, "Inca house", also spelled Incahuasi, Inca Huasi) is an archaeological site in the Huancavelica Region in Peru. The Inca palace is considered one of the most important monuments of the Huancavelica Region. Inka Wasi is located in the Huaytará Province, Huaytará District, about 25 km from Huaytará.

References 

 www.panoramio.com Complejo arqueologico Incawasi, Huaytará - Huancavelica.  Retrieved  August 30, 2013 (coordinates)

Archaeological sites in Peru
Archaeological sites in Huancavelica Region